Anti-sexism is opposition to sexism.

Anti-sexism may also refer to:
Pro-feminism, support of the cause of feminism
Men's rights movement, a movement against sexism towards men

Anti-sex may refer to:
Antisexualism, opposition or hostility towards sexual behavior and sexuality

See also 
 Asexual (disambiguation)
 Asexuality
 Junior Anti-Sex-League, a fictional organization George Orwell's novel 1984
 Libido
 Sexualism